The 2009 South American Cross Country Championships took place on February 21, 2009.  The races were held at the Parque del Stadio Italiano in Coronel, near Concepción, Bío Bío, Chile.  A detailed report of the event was given for the IAAF.

Complete results and results for junior and youth competitions were published.

Medallists

Race results

Senior men's race (12 km)

Note: Athletes in parentheses did not score for the team result.

Junior (U20) men's race (8 km)

Note: Athletes in parentheses did not score for the team result.

Youth (U18) men's race (4 km)

Note: Athletes in parentheses did not score for the team result.

Senior women's race (8 km)

Note: Athletes in parentheses did not score for the team result.

Junior (U20) women's race (6 km)

Note: Athletes in parentheses did not score for the team result.

Youth (U18) women's race (3 km)

Note: Athletes in parentheses did not score for the team result.

Medal table (unofficial)

Note: Totals include both individual and team medals, with medals in the team competition counting as one medal.

Participation
According to an unofficial count, 73 athletes from 7 countries participated.

 (5)
 (23)
 (24)
 (3)
 Perú (9)
 (4)
 (5)

See also
 2009 in athletics (track and field)

References

South American Cross Country Championships
South American Cross Country Championships
South American Cross Country Championships
International athletics competitions hosted by Chile
Cross country running in Chile
February 2009 sports events in South America